Spencer Oliver (born 27 March 1975) is an English former professional boxer. He was nicknamed "The Omen".

Oliver won a silver medal for England in the bantamweight division at the 1994 Commonwealth Games in Victoria, Canada.

Professional career
From 1995 to 1998, Oliver competed as a professional. When he defeated Bulgaria's Martin Krastev in May 1997 he became the European (EBU) super bantamweight champion. He held onto the title for a year, defending it on three occasions with wins over Serge Poilblan, Vincenzo Belcastro and Fabrice Benichou.

Injury
In May 1998 he sought to defend his title again with a bout against Sergey Devakov at Royal Albert Hall in London, which ended with Oliver suffering life-threatening injuries. Two minutes into the 10th round, Oliver was felled by a right hook and was counted out, the first loss of his career. It then became apparent that Spencer was seriously injured, a blood clot had formed in his brain, caused by a blood vessel that had been torn from a blow he received earlier in the fight. Spencer's cutman, Eddie Carter, is credited for saving his life, by instructing the paramedics to sedate the boxer in order to minimise the damage. For 15 minutes he was treated in the ring by paramedics and supplied with oxygen, before being taken unconscious to Charing Cross Hospital. He was later transferred to a specialist neurology hospital and underwent a successful operation to remove the blood clot.

Later life
Oliver now works as a pundit for Sky Sports and runs a boxing school in Edgware, London. He also hosts a boxing podcast with Jake Wood called Pound for Pound.

References

External links
 
 

1975 births
Living people
English male boxers
Bantamweight boxers
Commonwealth Games silver medallists for England
Commonwealth Games medallists in boxing
Boxers at the 1994 Commonwealth Games
European Boxing Union champions
Boxers from Greater London
Sky Sports presenters and reporters
English sports broadcasters
Medallists at the 1994 Commonwealth Games